Hungary competed at the 2011 World Aquatics Championships in Shanghai, China between July 16 and 31, 2011. 50 competitors, 25 men and 25 women took part.

Medalists

Diving

Hungary has qualified 3 athletes in diving. Nóra Barta has also qualified but withdrew due to injury.

Women

Open water swimming

Hungary has qualified 3 athletes in open water swimming. One of them, Éva Risztov also competed in swimming.

Men

Women

Swimming

Hungary has qualified 17 athletes in swimming.

Men

Women

Synchronised swimming

Hungary qualified 2 athletes in synchronised swimming.

Women

Water polo 

Hungary has qualified for both the men's and the women's tournaments.

Men

Team Roster 

Viktor Nagy
Miklós Gór-Nagy
Norbert Madaras
Dénes Varga
Márton Szivós
Norbert Hosnyánszky
Gergely Kiss
Zsolt Varga
Dániel Varga
Péter Biros – Captain
Ádám Steinmetz
Balázs Hárai
Zoltán Szécsi

Group A

Quarterfinals

Semifinals

Bronze medal game

Women

Team Roster

Orsolya Kasó
Dóra Czigány
Dóra Antal
Anna Illés
Gabriella Szűcs
Orsolya Takács
Rita Drávucz – Captain
Rita Keszthelyi
Ildikó Tóth
Barbara Bujka
Rita Poszkoli
Katalin Menczinger
Edina Gangl

Group A

Playoff round

Classification 9–12

Ninth place game

References

Nations at the 2011 World Aquatics Championships
World Aquatics Championships
Hungary at the World Aquatics Championships